Dakota Ridge is an unincorporated community and a census-designated place (CDP) located in and governed by Jefferson County, Colorado, United States. The CDP is a part of the Denver–Aurora–Lakewood, CO Metropolitan Statistical Area. The population of the Dakota Ridge CDP was 32,005 at the United States Census 2010. In 1988, voters turned down a proposal to incorporate Dakota Ridge. The community lies in ZIP codes 80127 and 80465.

Geography
Dakota Ridge is bordered to the east by Denver, to the north by Lakewood, and to the south by unincorporated Ken Caryl. It is bordered to the west by the Dakota Hogback, a sharp hogback ridge that to the north near Morrison is also known as Dinosaur Ridge.

Colorado State Highway 470, part of the beltway around the Denver metropolitan area, runs through the western part of the community, leading north to Golden and southeast to Highlands Ranch.

Demographics

Education
Dakota Ridge is served by the Jefferson County Public Schools.

See also

Outline of Colorado
Index of Colorado-related articles
State of Colorado
Colorado cities and towns
Colorado census designated places
Colorado counties
Jefferson County, Colorado
Colorado metropolitan areas
Front Range Urban Corridor
North Central Colorado Urban Area
Denver-Aurora-Boulder, CO Combined Statistical Area
Denver-Aurora-Broomfield, CO Metropolitan Statistical Area

References

External links

Jefferson County website
Jeffco Public Schools
Dakota Ridge High School

Census-designated places in Jefferson County, Colorado
Census-designated places in Colorado
Denver metropolitan area